Rostam Kalateh-ye Sadat (also Romanized as Rostam Kalāteh-ye Sādāt; also known as Rostam Kalāteh) is a village in Estarabad-e Shomali Rural District, Baharan District, Gorgan County, Golestan Province, Iran. At the 2006 census, its population was 819, in 200 families.

References 

Populated places in Gorgan County